Geastrum fimbriatum, commonly known as the fringed earthstar or the sessile earthstar, is an inedible species of mushroom belonging to the genus Geastrum, or earthstar fungi. First described in 1829, the species has a widespread distribution, and is found in Asia, Europe, and the Americas. It is distinguished from other earthstars by the delicate fibers that line the circular pore at the top of its spore sac.

Taxonomy
Elias Magnus Fries described Geastrum fimbriatum (as Geaster fimbriatus) in his 1829 Systema mycologicum.

It is commonly known as the fringed earthstar or the sessile earthstar. The specific epithet fimbriatum means "fringed", referring to the characteristic edge of the apical spore of the spore sac.

Description
The fruit bodies of Geastrum fimbriatum start out roughly spherical and hypogeous. As it matures, it pushed up through the soil and the other layer of the spore case (exoperidium) splits open to form between 5 and 8 rays that curve downward. Before expansion, the outer surface has a cottony surface with adherent soil particles; this ultimately peels off to reveal a smooth, grayish-brown surface. The inner spore sac is yellowish brown and features a small conical pore with fringed edges. Unlike other similar earthstar fungi, the edges of this pore are not sharply delimited from the rest of the spore sac, and do not have grooves. The fruit bodies have no distinctive taste or odor.

The spores are spherical, roughened by many small points or warts, and measure 2.4–4 μm. The capillitium is thick-walled, unbranched, and 4–7 μm thick.

Geastrum rufescens has reddish tones that are absent from G. fimbriatum.

Although typically listed by field guides as an inedible species, it is eaten by the tribal peoples of Madhya Pradesh.

Habitat and distribution
Geastrum fimbriatum is a saprobic species, and it fruit bodies grow on the ground in groups or clusters, usually near the stumps of hardwood trees. It is found in Asia (India l, Mongolia), eastern North America (including Mexico), Central America (Costa Rica), South America (Brazil), and Europe.

The species was depicted in a Nigerian postage stamp in 1985.

References

fimbriatum
Fungi described in 1829
Inedible fungi
Fungi of Europe
Fungi of North America
Taxa named by Elias Magnus Fries